Kusače may refer to:

 Kusače (Han Pijesak)
 Kusače (Sokolac)